Municipal elections were held in Costa Rica on Sunday, February 2, 2020, to elect all municipal offices in the country: mayors, aldermen, syndics (district council presidents), district councilors and the intendants of eight special autonomous districts, together with their respective alternates in all cases (see local government in Costa Rica). These will be the fifth direct municipal elections since the amendment to the 1998 Municipal Code and the second to be held mid-term since the 2009 reform.

In the newly founded canton of Río Cuarto, the election of mayor and members of the City Council was held for the first time.

As in previous elections the three main parties in number of mayors were the National Liberation Party (PLN) with 42 (losing 8 mayors including the provincial capitals of Cartago and Liberia from the previous elections in 2016), Social Christian Unity (PUSC) with 15, winning one extra mayor, and the Citizens' Action Party (PAC) with 4 (five if Montes de Oca's PAC-lead ruling coalition is counted), losing 2 from the prior reelection. The New Generation Party won one more mayor making a total of 4, despite not having parliamentary representation, and Social Christian Republican Party (a splinter from PUSC) won one extra mayor making a total of 2. The newly founded liberal party United We Can founded by former Libertarian deputy Natalia Diaz won the mayoralty of Oreamuno and had important support in several cantons, whilst Cartago was won by former deputy and presidential nominee Mario Redondo Poveda from Christian Democratic Alliance. The left-wing Broad Front lost its only mayor in Barva canton against the aforementioned PRSC.

This election also saw an increase in support of local parties. We Are Moravia won in Moravia, United Communal in Turrubares, Palmares First in Palmares, Sarchí Alliance in Sarchí, Santo Domingo Advance Movement in Santo Domingo, The Great Nicoya in Nicoya, Authentic Santacrucian in Santa Cruz, Nandayure Progresses in Nandayure, Authenthic Limonense in Limón and Recovering Values in Pococí won the mayoralties of their cantons, and the already locally dominant 21st Century Curridabat was re-elected in Curridabat. Nine cantonal parties and one provincial party reached mayoralties for the first time.

The two main evangelical parties, National Restoration and the New Republic Party, didn't win any mayors, which was noticed by the media and described as a political failure due to their larger totals in the previous general election. Lead by Fabricio Alvarado under the National Restoration banner, for the first time an Evangelical Christian party was one of the main voted ones in Costa Rica and went into the run-off against ruling PAC, reaching up to 800.000 votes despite losing the election. Alvarado quit National Restoration and founded New Republic party soon after but its results in the election were testimonial.

History

66 incumbent mayors tried to get reelected, of which 24 are National Liberation Party members, among them the current mayor of San José since 1998 and former presidential candidate Johnny Araya Monge. The PLN made no official coalitions but made an alliance (unofficial mutual support) with the National Restoration Party in San Carlos Canton. The PLN presented nominees in all 82 cantons being the party with the most nominees followed by Social Christian Unity Party and National Restoration Party.

Escazu's Arnoldo Barahona who was elected by the local Escazu's Progressive Yoke party ran his re-election through the New Generation Party.

The ruling Citizens' Action Party presented 55 candidates and formed three coalitions; in Aserrí together with the Social Christian Unity Party in the Aserrí of Everybody coalition supporting the Social Christian candidate; in Montes de Oca where it currently have the mayor's office the Montes de Oca People coalition was kept alongside the local Gente party, the Humanist Party and VAMOS; and Alliance for Nicoya in Nicoya where the local Nicoya Party would also participate. Originally in the canton of San José a coalition was planned under the Chepe Coalition banner alongside the provincial VAMOS party endorsing the candidacy of the independent Fernando Cartín and nominating the two vice mayor's offices, however the Electoral Court dissolved the coalition alleging that the VAMOS party did not nominated any candidate thus Cartín still ran but as an official PAC candidate (with VAMOS still as external supporter).

The Social Christian Unity Party took part in two coalitions; the above-mentioned with the PAC in Aserrí, and one with the local All For Flores party in the canton of Flores named Unity for Flores. Although there were negotiations for coalitions between the PAC and the Social Christian Republican Party (PRSC) in Belén, PRSC and Unidos Podemos in Heredia and with PAC in Cartago, these finally did not materialize.

The Broad Front made a coalition with the local party SJO Alternative named Juntos to participate in San José and with the Independent Belemite Party in the Belén Canton named Belemite Union.

New Republic, party of former candidate for National Restoration Party and second place in the 2018 presidential elections, Fabricio Alvarado, announced that it will not carry out coalitions with any other party, while the Libertarian Movement, once one of the largest parties in the country but now suffering a crisis, announced that it will not participate in the local elections.

Results

Overall

Mayor

By province

Municipal councils, syndics, district councils

Gallery

References

2020 elections in Costa Rica
2020 in Costa Rica
Local elections in Costa Rica